The 1969 Nebraska Cornhuskers football team represented the University of Nebraska in the 1969 NCAA University Division football season. The team was led by eighth-year head coach Bob Devaney and played their home games in Memorial Stadium in Lincoln.  In his first year as offensive coordinator, Tom Osborne instituted the I formation.

The Huskers lost the opener at home to fifth-ranked USC, and were 2–2 after a loss in the conference opener at #7 Missouri. They won their final six regular season games to tie for the Big Eight championship, were invited to the Sun Bowl in El Paso, and decisively beat the Georgia Bulldogs to finish the season at 9–2.

The Huskers' strong finish in 1969 was followed by consecutive national championships in 1970 and 1971; after the rout of second-ranked Alabama in the 1972 Orange Bowl, Nebraska's unbeaten streak reached 32 games.

Schedule

Roster

=

Coaching staff

Game summaries

USC

USC had a fight on their hands, despite jumping out to an early 14-0 lead.  Nebraska scrambled back and drew up within 7 points in the 4th quarter with 3:40 to go.  The Cornhuskers again got the ball back with enough time to score, but USC intercepted and converted the turnover into a field goal in the final seconds to decide the outcome.

Texas A&M

The Cornhuskers put up a touchdown in each of the first two quarters before Texas A&M was somehow able to bottle them up, but the Blackshirts had already established that the Aggies would get nothing on the day, and the 14 Nebraska points were carried for the win.

Minnesota

Nebraska QB Jerry Tagge broke a record while taking apart Minnesota in Minneapolis.  The 587 total Cornhusker yards was the second highest total in school history, and his 219 air yards and 82 ground yards rang up to 301 on the day, easily breaking the previous record of 264 yards set in 1951 and tied in 1967.  The game started in doubt as Minnesota struck first and forced Nebraska to a 14-14 tie at the half, but there would be no further scoring from the Golden Gophers to answer the additional 28 Nebraska points posted after the half.

Missouri

Nebraska attempted to bring a fight to Columbia to go along with their new #20 ranking, but after Missouri went up 7-0, it did not help that the Cornhuskers turned over a fumble to Missouri which was converted into 7 more points before the half.  Nebraska managed to avoid the shutout with a 3rd-quarter touchdown but could not overcome Missouri's defense to score again, and subsequently fell back out of the polls.

Kansas

Nebraska PK Paul Rogers set a Nebraska and Big 8 record with a 55-yard 1st-quarter field goal to open the scoring.  It was a fierce back-and-forth game, though Nebraska ran ahead by 14 only to have Kansas tie it up in the 3rd and pull ahead with a field goal in the 4th.  The Cornhuskers came through, however, putting in the game-winning touchdown with just 1:22 left to play.

Oklahoma State

The defensive struggle of the day kept the scores low and the game in doubt late, as Nebraska held only a 10-point lead to start the 4th quarter, but the defenses held on both sides and the Cornhuskers got the win.

Colorado

Nebraska's 13 point margin of victory was directly attributable to the school record 3 interceptions by Dana Stephenson, two of which were subsequently converted into touchdowns, giving Nebraska the upset win.

Iowa State

Iowa State was held to only 27 yards on the ground in front a Memorial Stadium homecoming crowd, as Nebraska held the Cyclones to just a 2nd-quarter field goal on their way to the win.

Kansas State

The Blackshirts allowed Kansas State a touchdown early on, but closed the door for the rest of the game.  The Cornhusker offense needed that support, as they were not able to put up their own points until splitting the uprights with a field goal late in the 3rd, and very much needed the touchdown punched in about 10 minutes later to pull ahead for the victory.

Oklahoma

Nebraska fought from behind to deliver Coach Devaney's first win in Norman, a convincing win in which the Blackshirts held the season's Heisman Trophy winner Steve Owens to just 71 yards with no touchdowns, breaking his 17-game touchdown streak.

Georgia

Nebraska opened the day with four straight 1st-quarter field goals, setting new Nebraska and Big 8 records in the process, which was the beginning of Georgia being left far behind.  By the time the Bulldogs found the scoreboard on a 4th-quarter touchdown, they merely closed the gap to 6-38, which the Cornhuskers then answered with one more touchdown before the final whistle.

Rankings

Awards

1969 Team Players in the NFL

The 1969 Nebraska Cornhuskers seniors selected in the 1970 NFL Draft:

The 1969 Nebraska Cornhuskers juniors selected in the following year's 1971 NFL Draft:

The 1969 Nebraska Cornhuskers sophomores selected in the 1972 NFL Draft:

NFL and Pro Players
The following 1969 Nebraska players joined a professional team as draftees or free agents.

References

Nebraska
Nebraska Cornhuskers football seasons
Big Eight Conference football champion seasons
Sun Bowl champion seasons
Nebraska Cornhuskers football